Souli is a 2004 Malagasy drama film written and directed by Alexander Abela and based on William Shakespeare's Othello. It follows Abela's 1999 film Makibefo, an adaptation of Macbeth.

Plot
Carlos (based on Shakespeare's Cassio) is a young Spanish student searching for the renowned Senegalese poet Souli, who may be the last griot to possess the "Thiossan tale". Souli, based on Othello, is working as a fisherman and living with a young French woman Mona (based on Desdemona). Abela's version of the villainous Iago is French trader Yann, who, helped by his girlfriend Abi, plots to destroy the lives of Souli and Mona.

Cast
Eduardo Noriega as Carlos
Aurélien Recoing as Yann
Makena Diop as Souli
Fatou N'Diaye as Abi
Jeanne Antebi as Mona

Distribution and reception
Souli played at festivals including the 2004 Montreal World Film Festival and the 2005 Rio de Janeiro International Film Festival. In 2005, it was nominated for the Grand Prix at the Paris Film Festival.

References

External links

 

2004 films
2004 drama films
French drama films
2000s French-language films
Malagasy-language films
Malagasy drama films
Films set in Madagascar
British drama films
Films based on Othello
2000s British films
2000s French films
2004 multilingual films
French multilingual films